The 1838 Maine gubernatorial election took place on September 10, 1838. Incumbent Whig Governor Edward Kent was defeated for re-election by Democratic candidate John Fairfield.

Results

References

Gubernatorial
1838
Maine
September 1838 events